
Gmina Limanowa is a rural gmina (administrative district) in Limanowa County, Lesser Poland Voivodeship, in southern Poland. Its seat is the town of Limanowa, although the town is not part of the territory of the gmina.

Villages
Gmina Limanowa contains the villages and settlements of Bałażówka, Kanina, Kisielówka, Kłodne, Koszary, Lipowe, Makowica, Męcina, Młynne, Mordarka, Nowe Rybie, Pasierbiec, Pisarzowa, Rupniów, Siekierczyna, Sowliny, Stara Wieś, Stare Rybie, Walowa Góra and Wysokie.

Neighbouring gminas
Gmina Limanowa is bordered by the town of Limanowa and by the gminas of Chełmiec, Jodłownik, Łapanów, Laskowa, Łososina Dolna, Łukowica, Podegrodzie, Słopnice, Trzciana and Tymbark.

References
 Polish official population figures 2006

Limanowa
Limanowa County